Ghailene Chaalali (born 28 February 1994) is a Tunisian professional footballer who plays as a midfielder for Espérance de Tunis and the Tunisia national team.

Club career
Chaalali participated in 2015 CAF Champions League with the club team Espérance de Tunis. During this competition, he scored a goal against Cosmos de Bafia of Cameroon.

International career
In 2017, Chaalali was summoned to a training course of the Tunisian team before a match against Egypt counting for the qualification at the 2019 Africa Cup of Nations in Cameroon.

In June 2018 he was named in Tunisia's 23-man squad for the 2018 World Cup in Russia.

Career statistics

Scores and results list Tunisia's goal tally first, score column indicates score after each Chaalali goal.

References

External links
 

1994 births
Living people
People from Manouba Governorate
Association football midfielders
Tunisian footballers
Tunisia international footballers
Expatriate sportspeople in Turkey
Espérance Sportive de Tunis players
Yeni Malatyaspor footballers
Tunisian Ligue Professionnelle 1 players
2018 FIFA World Cup players
2019 Africa Cup of Nations players
2021 Africa Cup of Nations players
2022 FIFA World Cup players